Pindimana is a village in Ernakulam district in the Indian state of Kerala.

Late Ex-MLA M. I. Markose is hailing from this village. It is believed that the name Pindimana is derived from the name of old 'Brahimin family'.  Thrikkariyoor is the nearby city. Its temple is one of the 108 Shiva temples. Thrikkariyoor was also an important town in the old age.

Demographics
 India census, Pindimana had a population of 12194 with 6107 males and 6087 females.

References

Villages in Ernakulam district